São Bernardo is a 1972 Brazilian film written and directed by Leon Hirszman, based on the novel São Bernardo by Graciliano Ramos. It stars Othon Bastos as Paulo Honório, a farmer and landowner in Brazil tortured by his personal desires and ambitions.

Release 
The film was released by Embrafilme in 1972 in Brazil. It was screened in 2012 by the Museum of Modern Art, in New York City.

Reception 
The film was called "a true masterpiece" by Brazilian film magazine Contracampo.

Awards 
The film won Best Actor for Bastos at the Gramado Film Festival.

References

External links 

1972 films
Brazilian drama films
1970s Portuguese-language films